Paleoboa is an extinct genus of snake from the Eocene of Germany.

References
 Bibliography of Fossil Vertebrates 1934-1938 by C. I. Camp 
 Romer, Alfred Sherwood 1956. The Osteology of the Reptiles

Eocene snakes
Extinct animals of Europe